The 1984 Bridgestone Doubles Championships was a tennis tournament played on indoor carpet courts in Tokyo, Japan that was part of the 1984 Virginia Slims World Championship Series. The tournament was held from March 5 through March 11, 1984.

Final

 Ann Kiyomura /  Pam Shriver defeated  Barbara Jordan /  Elizabeth Smylie, 6–3, 6–7, 6–3.
 It was Kiyomura's 1st title of the year and the 25th of her career. It was Shriver's 5th title of the year and the 53rd of her career.

References

Bridgestone doubles Championships
WTA Doubles Championships
1984 in Japanese tennis
Tennis tournaments in Japan